Charles Arundel "Joe" Moody (15 April 1917, London – 11 January 2009, West Palm Beach, Florida) was a Black British soldier who was the first commanding officer (Lt. Col.) of the 3rd Battalion Regiment of the Jamaica Regiment.

He was the son of Harold Moody and his wife Olive. Harold was a medical doctor and the political activist who founded the League of Coloured Peoples (LCP). He attended Alleyn's School, Dulwich.

Military career
Moody was 22 when the Second World War started in 1939. Under the impression he was eligible to become an officer in the British Army, he went to Whitehall for an interview, where he was dismayed to learn that only those of pure European descent could be commissioned as officers. However his father mobilised the LCP, the International African Service Bureau and the West African Students Union to campaign against this colour bar.

External links
 Biography at the Dover Society

References

1917 births
2009 deaths
Black British soldiers
Jamaican military personnel
British colonial army officers
English people of Jamaican descent
Military personnel from London